Starye Petushki is a rural locality (a village) and the administrative center of Petushinskoye Rural Settlement, Petushinsky District, Vladimir Oblast, Russia. The population was 445 as of 2010. There are 5 streets.

Geography 
Starye Petushki is located 5 km northeast of Petushki (the district's administrative centre) by road. Petushki is the nearest rural locality.

References 

Rural localities in Petushinsky District
Pokrovsky Uyezd